Goudie is a surname. Notable people with the surname include:

 Alexander Goudie, Scottish painter
 Andrew Goudie, geographer
 Big Boy Goudie
 Chuck Goudie (born 1956), American television journalist
 Elizabeth Goudie
 Gordon Goudie
 James B. Goudie Jr.
 John Goudie (1857–1921), Scottish international footballer
 Johnny Goudie (born 1968), Cuban-American singer, songwriter, musician, record producer and actor
 Joseph Goudie (born 1939), Canadian
 Kathy Goudie
 Lachlan Goudie (born 1976), Scottish artist and television broadcaster.
 Mark Goudie (born 1991), Scottish electrical engineer
 Mary Goudie, Baroness Goudie
 Rex Goudie, Canadian singer, songwriter and runner-up of Canadian Idol 3
 Sandra Goudie

Other
 Goudie (band)

See also
 Goudy (disambiguation)